Jacek Falkowski (born July 14, 1984 in Białystok) is a retired Polish footballer who played as a midfielder.

Successes

 1x Polish Cup Winner (2010) with Jagiellonia Białystok.

Career

Club
He was released from Polonia Bytom on 21 June 2011.

In July 2011, he joined Górnik Łęczna.

References

External links
 

1984 births
Living people
Polish footballers
Jagiellonia Białystok players
Znicz Pruszków players
Polonia Bytom players
Górnik Łęczna players
Association football midfielders
Sportspeople from Białystok